is a Japaese football manager and former player who manages Veertien Mie.

Playing career
Higuchi was born in Mie Prefecture on May 5, 1961. After graduating from high school, he played for Nissan Motors from 1980 to 1984.

Coaching career
After retirement, Higuchi started coaching career at Nissan Motors (later Yokohama F. Marinos) from 1985 and mainly coached youth team (1993–1998) and top team (1999–2005). In 2006, he moved to J2 League club Montedio Yamagata and became a manager for top team first time in his career. In 2008, he moved to J1 League club Omiya Ardija. Although he managed in J1 League in his career, he resigned in a year. In 2009, he signed with J2 club Yokohama FC. However he resigned for poor performance in a year. In 2010, he returned to Yokohama F. Marinos and served as an assistant coach under manager Kazushi Kimura. In 2012, Higuchi became a manager as Kimura successor. In 2013 J1 season, although the club was the top place until late, the club lost the last two matches and missed the league champions. In 2013 Emperor's Cup, the club won the champions defeated league champions Sanfrecce Hiroshima. He managed Marinos until end of 2014 season and moved to Ventforet Kofu in 2015. However the club results were bad and he resigned in May when the club at the bottom place. In 2016, he signed with J3 League club YSCC Yokohama which was the bottom place for the 2nd consecutive year in J3 until 2015. Although the club was bottom place in 2016, the club left the bottom place first time in 2017. He managed the club until end of 2018 season. He signed with J2 club FC Ryukyu in 2019 season.

Managerial statistics
Update; Games managed up to December 31, 2020

Honours
Yokohama F. Marinos
Emperor's Cup: 2013

References

External links

Yokohama F. Marinos

1961 births
Living people
Association football people from Mie Prefecture
Japanese footballers
Japan Soccer League players
Yokohama F. Marinos players
Japanese football managers
J1 League managers
J2 League managers
J3 League managers
Montedio Yamagata managers
Omiya Ardija managers
Yokohama FC managers
Yokohama F. Marinos managers
Ventforet Kofu managers
YSCC Yokohama managers
FC Ryukyu managers
Association footballers not categorized by position